Andrew Brickley (born August 9, 1961) is an American former professional hockey player, who spent 14 seasons playing in the National Hockey League, American Hockey League, and the International Hockey League. He currently serves as the color commentator for the Boston Bruins on the New England Sports Network.

Playing career

Amateur
As a youth, Brickley played in the 1974 Quebec International Pee-Wee Hockey Tournament with a minor ice hockey team from Melrose, Massachusetts.

Brickley played for the University of New Hampshire Wildcats from 1979 to 1982. In 93 games for the Wildcats, Brickley scored 68 goals with 69 assists for a total of 137 points. He led the Wildcats to the NCAA Final Four in 1982 and was named first team NCAA All-American the same year.

Professional
Brickley was drafted by the Philadelphia Flyers with the last overall pick in the 1980 NHL Entry Draft, eventually becoming the second player, after Gerry Meehan, to play in the NHL after being drafted last overall. Brickley first appeared with the Flyers during the 1982–83 season.

In October 1983, the Flyers traded Brickley to the Pittsburgh Penguins with Ron Flockhart, Mark Taylor, and two 1984 draft picks in exchange for Rich Sutter and two 1984 draft picks. Brickley played a total of 95 games for the Penguins over two seasons, totaling 25 goals and 35 assists. He was briefly demoted to the Baltimore Skipjacks of the American Hockey League (AHL) after he was caught breaking curfew with teammate Mike Bullard in Montreal.

The New Jersey Devils acquired Brickley in 1985 and sent him to the Maine Mariners for the 1985–86 season. In 60 games, he collected 26 goals and 34 assists, giving him the fourth-most points on the team. He made his debut with the Devils in 1986 and appeared in a total of 96 games in two seasons, collecting 19 goals and 26 assists. In 1987, he took a puck off his face in a game in Chicago, losing five teeth and getting 30 stitches, the first time in his career he would be injured that way. Brickley was placed on waivers following the 1987–88 NHL season and left unprotected by the Devils in the waiver draft, although the team demoted him to the Utica Devils in an effort to "hide" him and hold onto him for an additional season. The Boston Bruins picked Brickley up in the waiver draft.

Brickley played in 71 games with the Bruins in the 1988–89 NHL season, with 13 goals and 22 assists. In addition to his natural position at left wing, he played center and right wing frequently, filling in any position needed by Bruins coach Terry O'Reilly, a trend that continued the following season under Mike Milbury. On December 5, 1988, Brickley took another puck off his face, this time receiving credit for a goal after a Ray Bourque slapshot bounced off his face and into the goal. The injury required five stitches.

Brickley was on his way to the best season of his career in 1989–90 before being struck down by injuries. He scored his first goal of the season on October 26, 1989, against the Quebec Nordiques. On November 18, he collected his first career hat trick against the Devils, his former team. Brickley said of the occasion, "Whenever I can score against New Jersey, it is that much sweeter... I wanted to show them they made a mistake." Just days later, Brickley suffered an injury that severely hindered his ability to walk. In January, he pulled a muscle in his thigh and missed a week's worth of games. 43 games into the season, after totalling a career-high 40 points, Brickley was sidelined again when doctors discovered that a muscle in his right leg was calcifying, a condition known as myositis ossificans. Despite the injury and extended time out of action, Brickley was allowed to briefly play in Game 3 of the Stanley Cup Finals by Milbury.

Brickley had leg surgery on July 17, 1990 and missed all of training camp. The Bruins placed Brickley on waivers that December after he struggled to return to form. Brickley reported to the Maine Mariners, now Boston's affiliate, after going unclaimed. He expressed a desire to remain with the Bruins organization, mixed with uncertainty: "They say they're concerned about my game shape. Well, if they're concerned about that, why not send me down for the two-week conditioning period? Instead, they put me on irrevocable waivers. It really makes me wonder what my future is in the Bruins organization." Brickley went on a tear with the Mariners, collecting 25 points in 17 games and earning a brief recall to Boston, finishing the season with 2 goals and 9 assists in 40 NHL games, before injuring his shoulder in February.

Brickley began the 1991–92 season in Maine, cut out of training camp in September. He did well with the Mariners and was named team captain out of training camp before rejoining the Bruins in October. He proved his value after being recalled, with 19 points in his first 11 games, including making 8 goals on 15 shots in that span before suffering a shoulder injury in a game against the Hartford Whalers in November, which turned out to be a torn rotator cuff requiring surgery. He remained sidelined until February, first appearing in a charity skills competition with his teammates (and winning the shooting accuracy contest) and then returning to the lineup in mid-February against the St. Louis Blues. Still struggling late in the season, the Bruins eventually returned Brickley and other veterans to Maine, favoring youth over experience, and eventually cutting ties with them all after the season ended.

After being released by Boston, Brickley signed a two-way contract with the Winnipeg Jets, and began the season with the AHL's Moncton Hawks. After about three weeks in the AHL, the Jets recalled Brickley for an eleven-game stretch in which he scored two points. Brickley played one more regular season game for the Jets, plus one playoff game in which he collected a goal and an assist. While playing for the Hawks that season, however, Brickley collected 15 goals and 36 assists in 38 games. Brickley appeared in just two games for Winnipeg the following season, but continued to have success in the AHL. He played in barely more than half of the Hawks' first 56 games while recovering from another rotator cuff injury, but following his brief two-game callup with the Jets, he led the league in shooting at 26.7 percent and collected four assists in a single game against Fredericton the night after scoring the game-tying goal with four seconds remaining in regulation.

For the 1994–95 NHL season, Brickley joined the New York Islanders, but never appeared in a game for them. Instead, he was assigned to the International Hockey League's Denver Grizzlies, missing the first month and a half of the season with knee trouble. He returned to score 50 points in 58 games with the Grizzlies and led them to the Turner Cup for the first of two consecutive seasons. He played his final game with the Grizzlies in 1996 before retiring.

Years later, Brickley said of his career, "My story is a good one. I was always a B team player growing up. A walk-on through college and I finally got an opportunity because I stayed with it. I was the NHL's version of Mr. Irrelevant and I happily played 13 years."

Broadcasting career
Brickley's first experience as a broadcaster came when he was with the Grizzlies, participating in broadcasts while he was injured.

WBZ Radio hired Brickley in 1996 to replace Barry Pederson as the color commentator on Bruins radio broadcasts. In 1997, UPN 38 selected Brickley as Derek Sanderson's replacement on Bruins television broadcasts. He joined NESN in 2000, initially working primarily road games with broadcaster Dave Shea. Beginning with the 2005–06 season, Brickley called all games, doing the road games with Jack Edwards and the home games with Dale Arnold. Since the 2007–08 season, he and Edwards have called all of NESN's Bruins telecasts. Brickley also did color commentary for Versus, and has occasionally done the same with NBCSN for their televised NHL games as a guest commentator.

Brickley is known for using the phrase "get their skating game going" when the Bruins are mired in a stretch of lackluster play.

Personal life
Brickley currently resides in Hingham, Massachusetts, with his wife and two daughters. Diane Brickley is on the board of directors for Good Sports, an organization that donates sporting goods to community organizations that offer sports programs to disadvantaged youths.

Brickley has a history of athletic prowess in his family. His grandfather, George Brickley, played for the Philadelphia Athletics in 1913. His great-uncle was college football player and coach Charles Brickley. His younger brother Quintin, also played hockey for the University of New Hampshire. His nephew Connor Brickley played for the University of Vermont and was selected to play with Team USA at the 2012 World Junior Ice Hockey Championships.

His nephew Daniel Brickley also plays ice hockey.

Career statistics

Awards and honors

References

External links
 
 Boston Bruins Alumni Partnership with Massachusetts Down Syndrome Congress
 NESN profile

1961 births
Living people
American men's ice hockey left wingers
Baltimore Skipjacks players
Boston Bruins players
Boston Bruins announcers
Boston sportscasters
Denver Grizzlies players
Maine Mariners players
Moncton Hawks players
National Hockey League broadcasters
New Hampshire Wildcats men's ice hockey players
New Jersey Devils players
People from Melrose, Massachusetts
Philadelphia Flyers players
Philadelphia Flyers draft picks
Pittsburgh Penguins players
Providence Bruins players
Springfield Indians players
Utah Grizzlies (IHL) players
Utica Devils players
Winnipeg Jets (1979–1996) players
Ice hockey players from Massachusetts
AHCA Division I men's ice hockey All-Americans